

2015–16 NCAA bowl games

 December 19, 2015 – January 11, 2016: 2015–16 NCAA football bowl games

2015–16 College Football Playoff Bowl Games

 Note: Both Cotton Bowl Classic and Orange Bowl winners qualify to compete in the championship game.
 December 31, 2015
 2015 Peach Bowl in Atlanta
 The Houston Cougars defeated the Florida State Seminoles, with the score of 38–24.
 2015 Cotton Bowl Classic in Arlington
 The Alabama Crimson Tide defeated the  Michigan State Spartans, with the score of 38–0.
 2015 Orange Bowl in Miami Gardens
 The Clemson Tigers defeated the Oklahoma Sooners, with the score of 37–17.
 January 1, 2016
 2016 Fiesta Bowl in Glendale
 The Ohio State Buckeyes defeated the Notre Dame Fighting Irish, with the score of 44–28.
 2016 Rose Bowl in Pasadena
 The Stanford Cardinal defeated the Iowa Hawkeyes, with the score of 45–16.
 2016 Sugar Bowl in New Orleans
 The Ole Miss Rebels defeated the Oklahoma State Cowboys, with the score of 48–20.

2016 College Football Playoff National Championship

 January 11, 2016: 2016 College Football Playoff National Championship in Glendale
 The Alabama Crimson Tide defeated the Clemson Tigers, with the score of 45–40.

2015–16 Non-CFP bowl games

 December 19, 2015 
 2015 Cure Bowl in Orlando (debut event)
 The San Jose State Spartans defeated the Georgia State Panthers, with the score of 27–16.
 2015 New Mexico Bowl in Albuquerque
 The Arizona Wildcats defeated the New Mexico Lobos, with the score of 45–37.
 2015 Las Vegas Bowl in Whitney
 The Utah Utes defeated the BYU Cougars, with the score of 35–28.
 2015 Camellia Bowl in Montgomery
 The Appalachian State Mountaineers defeated the Ohio Bobcats, with the score of 31–29.
 2015 New Orleans Bowl in 
 The Louisiana Tech Bulldogs defeated the Arkansas State Red Wolves, with the score of 47–28.
 December 21, 2015
 2015 Miami Beach Bowl in 
 The Western Kentucky Hilltoppers defeated the South Florida Bulls, with the score of 45–35.
 December 22, 2015
 2015 Famous Idaho Potato Bowl in Boise
 The Akron Zips defeated the Utah State Aggies, with the score of 23–21.
 2015 Boca Raton Bowl in 
 The Toledo Rockets defeated the Temple Owls, with the score of 32–17.
 December 23, 2015
 2015 Poinsettia Bowl in San Diego
 The Boise State Broncos defeated the Northern Illinois Huskies, with the score of 55–7.
 2015 GoDaddy Bowl in Mobile
 The Georgia Southern Eagles defeated the Bowling Green Falcons, with the score of 58–27.
 December 24, 2015
 2015 Bahamas Bowl in Nassau
 The Western Michigan Broncos defeated the Middle Tennessee Blue Raiders, with the score of 45–31.
 2015 Hawaii Bowl in Honolulu
 The San Diego State Aztecs defeated the Cincinnati Bearcats, with the score of 42–7.
 December 26, 2015
 2015 St. Petersburg Bowl in 
 The Marshall Thundering Herd defeated the Connecticut Huskies, with the score of 16–10.
 2015 Sun Bowl in El Paso
 The Washington State Cougars defeated the Miami Hurricanes, with the score of 20–14.
 2015 Heart of Dallas Bowl in 
 The Washington Huskies defeated the Southern Miss Golden Eagles, with the score of 44–31.
 2015 Pinstripe Bowl in The Bronx (New York City)
 The Duke Blue Devils defeated the Indiana Hoosiers, with the score of 44–41.
 2015 Independence Bowl in Shreveport
 The Virginia Tech Hokies defeated the Tulsa Golden Hurricane, with the score of 55–52.
 2015 Foster Farms Bowl in Santa Clara
 The Nebraska Cornhuskers defeated the UCLA Bruins, with the score of 37–29.
 December 28, 2015
 2015 Military Bowl in Annapolis
 The Navy Midshipmen defeated the Pittsburgh Panthers, with the score of 44–28.
 2015 Quick Lane Bowl in Detroit
 The Minnesota Golden Gophers defeated the Central Michigan Chippewas, with the score of 21–14.
 December 29, 2015
 2015 Armed Forces Bowl in Fort Worth
 The California Golden Bears defeated the Air Force Falcons, with the score of 55–36.
 2015 Russell Athletic Bowl in Orlando
 The Baylor Bears defeated the North Carolina Tar Heels, with the score of 49–38.
 2015 Arizona Bowl in Tucson (debut event)
 The Nevada Wolf Pack defeated the Colorado State Rams, with the score of 28–23.
 2015 Texas Bowl in Houston
 The LSU Tigers defeated the Texas Tech Red Raiders, with the score of 56–27.
 December 30, 2015
 2015 Birmingham Bowl in 
 The Auburn Tigers defeated the Memphis Tigers, with the score of 31–10.
 2015 Belk Bowl in Charlotte
 The Mississippi State Bulldogs defeated the NC State Wolfpack, with the score of 51–28.
 2015 Music City Bowl in Nashville
 The Louisville Cardinals defeated the Texas A&M Aggies, with the score of 27–21.
 2015 Holiday Bowl in San Diego
 The Wisconsin Badgers defeated the USC Trojans, with the score of 23–21.
 January 1, 2016
 2016 Outback Bowl in Tampa
 The Tennessee Volunteers defeated the  Northwestern Wildcats, with the score of 45–6.
 2016 Citrus Bowl in Orlando
 The Michigan Wolverines defeated the Florida Gators, with the score of 41–7.
 January 2, 2016
 2016 TaxSlayer Bowl in Jacksonville
 The Georgia Bulldogs defeated the Penn State Nittany Lions, with the score of 24–17.
 2016 Liberty Bowl in Memphis
 The Arkansas Razorbacks defeated the Kansas State Wildcats, with the score of 45–23.
 2016 Alamo Bowl in San Antonio
 The TCU Horned Frogs defeated the Oregon Ducks, with the score of 47–41.
 2016 Cactus Bowl in Phoenix
 The West Virginia Mountaineers defeated the  Arizona State Sun Devils, with the score of 36–32.

National Football League
 January 31: 2016 Pro Bowl in Honolulu at Aloha Stadium
 Team Irvin defeated Team Rice, with the score of 49–27.
 Offensive MVP: Russell Wilson (Seattle Seahawks)
 Defensive MVP: Michael Bennett (Seattle Seahawks)
 February 7: Super Bowl 50 in Santa Clara, California at Levi's Stadium
 The Denver Broncos defeated the Carolina Panthers, 24–10, to win their third Super Bowl title.
 MVP: Von Miller (Denver Broncos)
 April 28 – 30: 2016 NFL draft in Chicago at the Auditorium Theatre
 #1 pick: Jared Goff, from the California Golden Bears to the Los Angeles Rams
 September 8 – January 1, 2017: 2016 NFL season
 Regular season's AFC winner: New England Patriots
 Regular season's NFC winner: Dallas Cowboys

FISU
 June 1 – 11: 2016 World University American Football Championship in Monterrey
 In the final,  defeated , 35–7, to win their second World University Championship.  took third place.

IFAF
 June 28 – July 10: 2016 IFAF U-19 World Championship in Harbin at the Harbin University of Commerce
 September 7 – 12: 2016 IFAF Flag Football World Championship in Miami
 Men: The  defeated , 33–32, to win their second consecutive and third overall IFAF Flag Football World Championship title.
  took the bronze medal.
 Women:  defeated , 35–22, to win their first IFAF Flag Football World Championship title.
  took the bronze medal.

Pro Football Hall of Fame
Class of 2016:
Tony Dungy, player and coach
Brett Favre, player
Kevin Greene, player
Marvin Harrison, player
Orlando Pace, player
Ken Stabler, player
Dick Stanfel, player

References